XHPCMQ-FM is a radio station on 92.3 FM in Cadereyta de Montes, Querétaro. It is owned by Grupo Ultra and is known as Ultra with a romantic format (instead of the pop format common for its stations).

History
XHPCMQ was awarded in the IFT-4 radio auction of 2017 and came to air on June 3, 2018.

References

Radio stations in Querétaro
Radio stations established in 2018
2018 establishments in Mexico